DickPunks is a rock band based in South Korea, consisting of four members. The band was formed in November 2006, without a guitarist because the keyboard player, Hyunwoo, wanted the band to be considered a piano-driven ensemble. Hyunwoo formed the band by recruiting his friends as members. The band has maintained the original line-up since its creation and is currently managed by the TNC Company.

Though DickPunks was one of many bands in Hongdae, they were popular amongst their critics and often nicknamed "Hongdae Idol", despite not being such literally. Wanting to expand their fan base, DickPunks decided to participate in Superstar K4. They finished the competition in second place in November 2012.

All of the band's members are credited with composing and producing their music. In addition to their live performances, they also perform a separate choreographed act entitled the DICKPUNKSHOW.

Members

 Kim Tae-hyun (김태현) – Vocals
 Kim Hyun-woo (김현우) – Keyboard
 Kim Jae-heung (김재흥) – Bass
 Park Ga-ram (박가람) – Drums

Discography

Studio albums

Extended plays

Singles

|"—" denotes releases that did not chart.
|

Collaborations

Soundtrack appearances

Compilations

Awards
 2012 – MNET "Superstar K Season 4" – 2nd place

Live performances
2008 to Present – DickPunks solo concert (11th DICKPUNKSHOW in MAY 2013)
2007 to Present – Street performance over 1000 times
2012 – 2013 Pentaport Rock Festival
2011 – 2011 Green Plugged 2011
2012 – Superstar K4 Concert
2011 – 2013 Pusan Rock Festival
2013 – Green Plugged 2013
2010 – MUSICAL "Looking for the CheerGirl"
2013 – Son Yeon-Jae gala show

Appearances and media
2012 – MNET "Superstar K" (season 4)
2013 – MNET "MUST"
2013 – MNET "MCOUNTDOWN"

References

External links
 Official YouTube channel
 Official Twitter
 Official club website

Musical groups established in 2006
Musical quartets
Superstar K participants
South Korean rock music groups